Steve Abbott may refer to:

 Steve Abbott (comedian) (born 1956), Australian comedian and author
Steve Abbott (film producer) (born 1954), British film producer
 Steve Abbott (musician) (born 1960), British artist manager, promoter, and consultant
 Steve Abbott (politician) (born 1962), American politician